James H. Holdcroft (1874 – 1926) was a footballer who played for Burslem Port Vale in the mid-1890s

Career
Holdcroft joined Burslem Port Vale in March 1894. He made 12 Second Division appearances in the 1894–95 season and played 24 league and two FA Cup games in the 1895–96 campaign, as Vale lost their Football League status. He played 16 Midland League matches, before he was released from the Athletic Ground at the end of the 1896–97 season.

Career statistics
Source:

References

1874 births
1926 deaths
Sportspeople from Burslem
English footballers
Association football midfielders
Port Vale F.C. players
Midland Football League players
English Football League players